Annibale Bentivoglio may refer to:

Annibale I Bentivoglio (1415–1445), absolute ruler of the Italian city of Bologna
Annibale II Bentivoglio (1467–1540), Italian condottiero who was shortly lord of Bologna 
Annibale Bentivoglio (archbishop) (died 1663), Italian Roman Catholic archbishop

See also
Bentivoglio family